South Down was a constituency of the Parliament of Northern Ireland.

Boundaries
South Down was a county constituency comprising part of southern County Down. It was created when the House of Commons (Method of Voting and Redistribution of Seats) Act (Northern Ireland) 1929 introduced first-past-the-post elections throughout Northern Ireland. South Armagh was created by the division of Down into eight new constituencies. The constituency survived unchanged, returning one Member of Parliament until the Parliament of Northern Ireland was temporarily suspended in 1972, and then formally abolished in 1973.

The seat was centred on the towns of Newry and Warrenpoint, and also included certain district electoral divisions of the rural districts of Kilkeel and Newry No. 1.

Politics 
The seat had a substantial nationalist majority, with nationalist candidates winning every election, excepting 1938, when no nationalist stood. In 1933 it elected Irish Prime Minister Éamon de Valera, though he did not sit in the Stormont Parliament.

Members of Parliament

Election results 

At the 1962 Northern Ireland general election, Joe Connellan was elected unopposed.

References

Historic constituencies in County Down
Northern Ireland Parliament constituencies established in 1929
Constituencies of the Northern Ireland Parliament
Northern Ireland Parliament constituencies disestablished in 1973